James Neil Phillips (born 8 February 1966) is an English football coach and former professional footballer.

As a player, he was a defender who notably played in the Premier League for Middlesbrough and Bolton Wanderers. He also played in the Scottish Premiership for Rangers and in the Football League with Oxford United. Whilst at Bolton he played in the 1995 Football League Cup Final.

Following retirement, he returned and has coached their reserve and academy teams as well as holding the position of first team caretaker manager on three occasions. The last role he held at the club was academy director.

Coaching career
Phillips joined the Bolton Wanderers youth coaching staff whilst still a player for the team, starting his role as a coach on 1 June 2000, then retired as a player a year later, though he played no matches during his final season as a registered player/coach.

On 9 October 2001, Phillips was appointed joint caretaker manager of Bolton alongside Sammy Lee following the sacking of Owen Coyle. However, Phillips took control of first team affairs, with Lee and Julian Darby assisting him.

Phillips first game in temporary charge saw him lead his hometown club to a 3–2 victory over Bristol City at the Reebok Stadium with Bolton having recovered from being two goals down early in the game. His second match in caretaker charge came at Wolverhampton Wanderers Molineux Stadium which ended in a 2–2 draw with Mark Davies scoring a 90th-minute equaliser for Bolton.

On 23 October 2012, Crystal Palace confirmed that manager Dougie Freedman had left the club for Bolton wanderers. Bolton were yet to confirm the appointment though and Phillips then confirmed he would be in charge of the next match against Middlesbrough whilst Freedman was still in discussions with Gartside. Bolton lost 2–1. When Freedman was appointed, Phillips went back to coaching the youth team.

On 15 March 2016, he assumed interim charge of the Bolton team following the departure of Neil Lennon by mutual consent, and did the same in August 2019 after Phil Parkinson resigned. On 21 July 2020, the club confirmed that Phillips had stepped down from his role as Academy Director as a result of Bolton dropping to a Category Three Academy, ending a thirty year association with the club.

Personal life
Jimmy's son, Nat Phillips, is also a footballer and played for him in the Bolton Wanderers academy. He is currently playing as a centre back for Liverpool F.C.

Managerial statistics

Honours
Bolton Wanderers
 First Division: 1996–97

References

External links

1966 births
Living people
Footballers from Bolton
English footballers
Bolton Wanderers F.C. players
Middlesbrough F.C. players
Oxford United F.C. players
Rangers F.C. players
Premier League players
English Football League players
Scottish Football League players
Bolton Wanderers F.C. non-playing staff
English football managers
Bolton Wanderers F.C. managers
English Football League managers
Association football defenders
Association football coaches